Joel Orville Ross  (born June 12, 1992) is an American football cornerback. He played college football at Appalachian State.

Professional career

Tampa Bay Buccaneers
Ross signed with the Tampa Bay Buccaneers on December 30, 2015.

Chicago Bears
On August 3, 2016, Ross signed with the Chicago Bears. On August 28, 2016, Ross was waived by the Bears.

References

External links
Appalachian State Mountaineers bio
Tampa Bay Buccaneers bio

1992 births
Living people
American football cornerbacks
Tampa Bay Buccaneers players
Chicago Bears players
Calgary Stampeders players
Appalachian State Mountaineers football players